The War Doctor is an incarnation of the Doctor, the protagonist of the BBC science fiction television programme Doctor Who. He was portrayed by the English actor John Hurt. Although he precedes Christopher Eccleston's Ninth Doctor in the show's fictional chronology, his first onscreen appearance came eight years after Eccleston's; the War Doctor was retroactively created by showrunner Steven Moffat for productions celebrating the show's 50th anniversary.

Within the programme's narrative, the Doctor is an alien Time Lord from the planet Gallifrey, who is hundreds if not thousands of years old and travels in time and space in his TARDIS, frequently with companions. When the Doctor is critically injured, he can regenerate his body, but in doing so, gains a new physical appearance and with it, a distinct new personality. This plot device has allowed a number of actors to portray different incarnations of the Doctor over the show's long run.

The War Doctor, not so named within the episodes in which he appears, is introduced as the incarnation of the Doctor who fought in the Time War of the show's modern-day backstory. He was created as a result of a conscious decision of the Eighth Doctor, played by Paul McGann, to take up arms and become a warrior; in accepting this duty, the War Doctor disowned the title of "Doctor", and after the war's end is viewed with disdain by his subsequent incarnations, who reclaim the title that the character is known by. In the 50th anniversary special "The Day of the Doctor", however, the Eleventh Doctor played by Matt Smith revises his opinion of this incarnation after revisiting the final moments of the war.

In his original conception of the show's anniversary special, Moffat had written the Ninth Doctor as having ended the Time War. However, he was "pretty certain" that Christopher Eccleston would decline to return to the role, which he did. As he also had reservations about making Paul McGann's Eighth Doctor the incarnation who had ended the war, he created a never-before-seen past incarnation of the Doctor, which allowed him "a freer hand" in writing the story, acknowledging that the success of doing this would be predicated on being able to cast an actor with a significant enough profile.

Costume

In "The Name of the Doctor", Hurt wore a burgundy and ivory scarf in a herringbone style. He also wore a dark brown leather trenchcoat, similar to the Ninth Doctor's black leather peacoat as well as a green brown moleskin waistcoat with a fob watch, dark tan trousers, and charcoal leather gaiters similar to ones worn by the Eighth Doctor. Costume designer Howard Burden said that Hurt's character was a "dark Doctor" existing between the Doctor's eighth and ninth incarnations.

He was also seen to use a new sonic screwdriver with a scarlet light, closely matching the prop used by the Third and Fourth Doctors. He kept it in a bandolier originally worn by Cass, played by Emma Campbell-Jones, a young pilot who dies after refusing the Doctor's help due to him being a Time Lord.

Appearances
The War Doctor first appears at the conclusion of the series seven finale "The Name of the Doctor" when the Eleventh Doctor (Matt Smith) and companion Clara Oswald (Jenna-Louise Coleman) are trapped in the Doctor's timeline. Clara believes she has seen all the Doctor's faces, but does not recognise one figure. The Doctor (Smith) tells her that he is yet another version of himself, albeit one who has lost the right to the name of the Doctor; when the figure declares that he did what he did "without choice [...] in the name of peace and sanity", the Doctor, before he and Clara return to the universe, states that the figure did not make his choice in the name of the Doctor.

The War Doctor's origins are given in the mini-episode "The Night of the Doctor", set during the Time War referred to in the series. After the Eighth Doctor (Paul McGann) is killed in a spaceship crash while trying to save an innocent woman, who rejected his efforts because she regards the Time Lords and the Daleks as equally monstrous for the collateral damage inflicted in the war, he is temporarily resurrected by the Sisterhood of Karn (last seen in The Brain of Morbius) and urged to take a stand and join the war. He is offered an elixir designed to trigger a life-saving regeneration into a form of his choice. Feeling the universe has no more need for a doctor, he requests to become a warrior. After regenerating into the War Doctor, he disowns the name of the Doctor, with his new incarnation's first words being "Doctor no more".

In the 50th anniversary special "The Day of the Doctor", having fought in the Time War for many years, the greatly aged War Doctor steals the superweapon known as "the Moment" with the intent of wiping out all combatants in the war along with his home world of Gallifrey. However, the Moment is sentient, possessing a conscience that requires the user to morally justify his use of it, and interacts with him in the shape of his future companion Rose Tyler (Billie Piper). Although acknowledging that she can do what the Doctor asks of her, she then sends the War Doctor into his future to meet the Tenth and Eleventh Doctors (David Tennant and Matt Smith respectively) to understand the sadness and regret they endured while continuing the good he failed to accomplish. Having witnessed his future selves prevent a Zygon conquest of Earth and the destruction of London, the War Doctor concludes that he must destroy Gallifrey, reflecting that he is lighting the fire so that better Doctors can be forged, only for the Tenth and Eleventh Doctors to travel back to activate the Moment with him, the later Doctors declaring that they now recognise the War Doctor as having been "the Doctor on the day it wasn't possible to get it right". However, aided by the Moment's interface which shows them a vision of the horror and destruction wrought in the Fall of Arcadia, the last battle in which the War Doctor fought, and Clara's plea to remember the vow they made in taking their name, the Doctors ultimately conclude that the loss of life that would be caused by using the Moment is something they cannot accept. They instead pool their resources, and with the help of the Doctor's various incarnations, attempt to save Gallifrey by freezing it in a moment in time, creating the illusion of the planet's own destruction. The Daleks are effectively tricked into firing on each other, annihilating themselves. The War Doctor accepts that upon returning to his own timeframe, he will forget his own heroic actions and must live with the false belief that he killed his own people. Before leaving, he takes a moment to thank his future selves for helping him "become the Doctor" again. Once inside his TARDIS, he begins to regenerate, realising that his body is "wearing a bit thin", echoing the First Doctor's utterances in The Tenth Planet.

The War Doctor appears in archive footage in the 2014 episode "Listen". The episode reveals that the barn to which the War Doctor travelled, in order to activate the Moment, was part of the Doctor's childhood home. Through similar footage he also appeared in "The Zygon Invasion", during which it is learned that the peace talks orchestrated by himself and his future incarnations resulted in 20 million Zygons taking up residence on Earth disguised as humans as part of an uneasy truce.

The War Doctor is not seen but is mentioned during "Hell Bent", upon the Twelfth Doctor's return to Gallifrey. A Time Lord soldier recalls that he served with the War Doctor during the battle of Skull Moon. He observes "the first thing you notice about the Doctor of War is that he's unarmed, for many it's also the last."

His likeness is seen in "Twice Upon a Time" when Testimony show the First Doctor the man he will become. Testimony uses the titles "Doctor of War" and "Butcher of Skull Moon" as some of the names he will be known by, both previously used to refer to the War Doctor during "Hell Bent". Later, after the Twelfth Doctor saves two soldiers on the battlefield, the First Doctor remarks "that's what it means to be a Doctor of War."

The War Doctor appeared in a sequence along with all the other incarnations of the Doctor, when the Thirteenth Doctor broke out of the Matrix in “The Timeless Children”.

In other media
The War Doctor appears in the BBC Books novel Engines of War by George Mann. The novel details the events leading to the Doctor's decision to detonate the Moment, as seen in "The Day of the Doctor", including his decision to act against the resurrected Rassilon and the death of a temporary companion as he acts to stop a Dalek plot to develop a weapon that could erase Gallifrey from history. The War Doctor appears alongside the other incarnations of the Doctor in the 2014 collection The Shakespeare Notebooks. The War Doctor's segment is titled "A Prologue", and purports to be a fictionalised account of the Time War written by William Shakespeare. A further prose story titled "The Stranger" was released in 2015 as part of the Heroes and Monsters Collection, while another George Mann story, "Decoy", appears in the 2019 collection Doctor Who The Target Storybook, in which the War Doctor stands up to Rassilon to save General Artarix and a Time Lord fleet from a suicide mission.

In May 2015, it was announced by Titan Books that the War Doctor would be the fourth incarnation joining the Tenth, Eleventh and Twelfth Doctors in their Four Doctors crossover mini-series. This is the War Doctor's second appearance in comics, the incarnation having previously featured in a non-speaking cameo in IDW's Dead Man's Hand. The War Doctor appears in the first issue, in a flashback. The War Doctor - along with his companion, the Squire - also appears in a number of flashbacks in the second year of Titan's Eleventh Doctor comic series, which involves the Doctor being put on trial for a crime he is believed to have committed in his earlier incarnation. The War Doctor essentially takes over as the lead incarnation in the stories The Organ Grinder and Kill God, with the Eleventh Doctor being largely absent from both stories, while his current companion Alice travels back to the Time War to help set up the events that the Eleventh Doctor is experiencing in the 'present', the crisis ending with Alice returning to her era and the War Doctor's memory of his time with her scrambled to preserve history.

The War Doctor, along with the other twelve incarnations, appears in the 2015 video game Lego Dimensions, voiced using clips of John Hurt's dialogue from his episodes. The War Doctor also appears as a playable character in the mobile game Doctor Who Legacy.

A younger War Doctor appears in a flashback sequence in a Twelfth Doctor storyline, which sees the Twelfth Doctor reflect on the events that led to the apparent death of his old acquaintance Fey Truscott-Sade and his own darker view on the Time War.

Audio dramas
It was announced in October 2015 that John Hurt would reprise his role as the War Doctor for a series of audio plays by Big Finish Productions starting in December of that year. The War Doctor ran for twelve episodes over four box sets. The range concluded with Casualties of War in February 2017, a month after Hurt's death, and saw the Doctor reunite with Leela (Louise Jameson).

In 2020, Big Finish announced a prequel series - The War Doctor Begins - with actor and impressionist Jonathon Carley taking over the title role. The first volume was  released in June 2021.

Notes

References

External links 

War
Television characters introduced in 2013
Male characters in television
Extraterrestrial characters in television
Fictional war criminals